Warner Lawrence is a fireboat owned and operated by the Los Angeles Fire Department (LAFD) in Los Angeles. Designed by Robert Allan Ltd. in the early 2000s, Warner Lawrence was built in Washington and delivered to San Pedro on 21 May 2003. She was dedicated on 12 April of that year. She was built by Nichols Boats of Freeland, Washington, according to the LAFD. She replaced the fireboat Ralph J. Scott.

It is an omnidirectional vessel driven by two Voith Schneider Propellers type 26 GII/165-AE 45. Its pumps are powered by two  pump engines.

References

External links
Los Angeles Fire Department Home Page
Los Angeles Fire Department Warner Lawrence
 

Government of Los Angeles
Fireboats of California
2003 ships